The 8th Battle Squadron  was a squadron of the British Royal Navy assembled prior to the beginning of World War I; it was later assigned to the Third Fleet.  The squadron consisted of pre-dreadnought type battleships.  It existed from 1912 to 1914.

The squadron was established in December 1912. In December 1913 it was assigned to the Third Fleet  and in August 1914 it was based at HMNB Devonport. The Third Fleet included the 7th and 8th Battle Squadrons, and consisted of the Royal Navy's oldest battleships and cruisers.

Rear-Admirals, commanding
Post holders included:

Footnotes

References
 Harley, Simon; Lovell, Tony. "Eighth Battle Squadron (Royal Navy) - The Dreadnought Project". www.dreadnoughtproject.org. Harley & Lovell, 10 November 2016.
 Mackie, Colin. "Royal Navy Senior Appointments from 1865" (PDF). gulabin. Colin Mackie, December 2017.
 Smith, Gordon. "Royal Navy ship dispositions 1914-1918: THE GRAND FLEET, 1914-1916 by Admiral Viscount Jellicoe". www.naval-history.net. Gordon Smith, 6 January 2015.

External links
 Eighth Battle Squadron at DreadnoughtProject.org
Royal Navy History
Composition of the Grand Fleet

Battle squadrons of the Royal Navy
Ship squadrons of the Royal Navy in World War I
Military units and formations established in 1912
Military units and formations disestablished in 1914